Tim Metcher (born 10 May 1991), is an Australian rugby union player. His usual position is prop. , he  plays for U.S. team Seattle Seawolves in Major League Rugby (MLR).

Early life
Metcher was born in Maroubra but spent most of his early years in Coffs Harbour on the North Coast of New South Wales. He represented New South Wales at the Australian Schools Rugby Championships.

Rugby career
Metcher played club rugby for the Gungahlin Eagles before being selected to join the Brumbies academy in 2011. He joined Sydney club Randwick that year and played for Australia U-20 at the 2011 IRB Junior World Championship in Italy. He switched to the Southern Districts club in 2012.

In 2013, Metcher played against the British and Irish Lions twice – firstly off the bench for the Western Force, and then starting as tighthead prop for Combined NSW-QLD Country. In early 2014 he was selected in the Gen Blue Waratahs development side to play in the Pacific Rugby Cup. Later in 2014 he joined the  squad, before signing with Melbourne. Metcher made six Super Rugby appearances for the Rebels and eight National Rugby Championship appearances for the Rising from 2015 to 2016.

He moved to the United States and began playing with the Seattle Seawolves in 2018.

Super Rugby statistics

Reference list

External links
Stats on statbunker.com

1991 births
Living people
Australian expatriate rugby union players
Australian expatriate sportspeople in the United States
Expatriate rugby union players in the United States
Melbourne Rebels players
Melbourne Rising players
Rugby union props
Seattle Seawolves players
New South Wales Country Eagles players
Western Force players
Counties Manukau rugby union players
Expatriate rugby union players in New Zealand
Rugby union players from Sydney